There have been 33 coaches of the South Sydney Rabbitohs since their first season in 1908.

List of coaches

See also

List of current NRL coaches
List of current NRL Women's coaches

References

External links

 
coaches
Sydney-sport-related lists
National Rugby League lists
Lists of rugby league coaches